Adrenergic receptor autoantibodies

The adrenergic receptors (or adrenoreceptors) are a class of cell membrane-bound protein receptors throughout the body that are targets of the catecholamines, especially norepinephrine (or noradrenaline) and epinephrine (or adrenaline). The binding to these receptors by catecholamines will generally stimulate the sympathetic nervous system, the arm of the autonomic nervous system responsible for the fight-or-flight response.

Adrenergic receptor autoantibodies are autoantibodies (antibodies directed against a person's own protein) targeting adrenergic receptors. 

The implications of high titers of these circulating antibodies are still being worked out and further investigated. There is compelling evidence that autoimmunity against this class of G protein-coupled receptors results in a variety of pathologies:

Cardiovascular diseases and events:

Circulating autoantibodies to adrenergic receptors have been identified in numerous heart diseases and cardiac symptoms. Laboratory models have revealed a mechanism by which adrenergic autoantibodies accomplish their effects on the cardiovascular system. “Beta1 autoantibodies trigger conformational changes in the receptor, attenuate receptor internalization. The combination of these two properties can result in bimodal effects on receptor activity that are meaningful for basal activity and chronotropic catecholamine responses of human cardiomyocytes.”

Beta-1 adrenergic receptors are the primary receptor of the heart and, therefore, autoantibodies to these receptors have been tied to many different heart diseases.

Autoantibodies to beta1-adrenergic receptors are linked to chronic heart failure. However, it has been proposed that both beta1-adrenergic receptor polymorphisms and autoantibodies could be working together in the development of chronic heart failure. Cardiomyopathy due to autoimmune dysregulation and production of autoantibodies has been seen in humans and reproduced in animal models. In rabbit models, increased expression of autoantibodies has been directly correlated with induction of atrial fibrillation. In canine models inoculated with adrenergic autoantibodies, it has been shown that beta blockers can negate certain cardiac arrhythmias. Refractory Hypertension associated with autoantibodies to beta1-adrenergic receptors has been documented in diabetic patients.

While the exact pathophysiology of Chagas disease is not completely understood, some models have shown that an overstimulation of the immune system causes production of adrenergic autoantibodies. Current research is trying to determine the exact role of these autoantibodies and whether they correlate with the symptomatology of Chagas disease.

Postural Orthostatic Tachycardia Syndrome

The Heart Rhythm Institute at the University of Oklahoma points to an autoimmune basis in a condition that presents as chronic malfunction of the autonomic nervous system. The work of endocrinology labs have correlated autoantibodies to the beta-adrenergic receptors with Postural Orthostatic Tachycardia Syndrome (POTS).

Doctors compare the level of disability seen in POTS to the quality of life experienced in conditions like Chronic Obstructive Pulmonary Disease (COPD) or congestive heart failure. With the vast and vague symptomatology, and no previously known etiology, diagnosis and treatment proved elusive and challenging. The identification of these antibodies and the development of better testing provide hope for more targeted therapies and better treatment outcomes.

Chronic Fatigue Syndrome:

Chronic Fatigue Syndrome (CFS), a disease characterized by profound fatigue, sleep abnormalities, pain, and other symptoms that are made worse by exertion, is infamous for its confounding etiology. Studies have revealed the specific connection between infection-trigger and disease onset in a cohort of Chronic Fatigue Syndrome patients. These patients showed significantly elevated antibodies to beta2-adrenergic receptors. Future research solidifying this correlation of CFS with autoantibodies to adrenergic receptors would be useful to clinicians tackling this difficult-to-treat condition that affects 200,000 people per year in the US.

Other:

Experimental studies observed that activating autoantibodies to the beta1/2-adrenergic and M2 muscarinic receptors are associated with atrial tachyarrhythmias in patients with hyperthyroidism. Additional research into the prevalence of these biomarkers in Grave's Disease (Grave's Hyperthyroidism) showed facilitated triggering of pulmonary veins and atrial fibrillation.

Adrenergic autoantibodies have been linked to Buerger's disease (thromboangiitis obliterans). Buerger's disease is a rare disease in which the arteries and veins in the arms and legs become inflamed, swell and can become blocked with blood clots, also known as thrombi.

References 

Adrenergic receptors
Autoimmune diseases